Imogen or Imogene may refer to:


Places
 Imogene, Iowa, a city
 Imogene, Minnesota, a populated place
 Imogene, South Dakota, an unincorporated community
 Imogene Pass, a mountain pass in the San Juan Mountains of Colorado
 Imogene Lake, Idaho
 Imogene Peak, Idaho
 Lake Imogene, Martin County, Minnesota

People and fictional characters
 Imogen (given name), a feminine given name, including a list of people and fictional characters named either Imogen or Imogene.

Arts and entertainment
 Imogen (Cymbeline) from William Shakespeare's play Cymbeline
 Imogen (video game), a BBC Micro computer game
 Imogene, original title of Girl Most Likely, a 2012 American comedy film
 "Imogene", a piece of instrumental music written and recorded in 1967 by Les Reed

Ships
 , six Royal Navy ships named either Imogen or Imogene

See also
 Innogen
 2015–16 UK and Ireland windstorm season#Storm Imogen